Rochester Township may refer to:

Canada
 Rochester Township, now part of Lakeshore, Ontario

United States
 Rochester Township, Sangamon County, Illinois
 Rochester Township, Fulton County, Indiana
 Rochester Township, Cedar County, Iowa
 Rochester Township, Kingman County, Kansas
 Rochester Township, Olmsted County, Minnesota
 Rochester Township, Andrew County, Missouri
 Rochester Township, Cass County, North Dakota, in Cass County, North Dakota
 Rochester Township, Lorain County, Ohio
 Rochester Township, Beaver County, Pennsylvania

Township name disambiguation pages